Rudayan is a town and a nagar panchayat in Badaun district in the Indian state of Uttar Pradesh.

Demographics
 India census, Rudayan had a population of 7,130. Males constitute 53% of the population and females 47%. Rudayan has an average literacy rate of 38%, lower than the national average of 59.5%: male literacy is 49%, and female literacy is 25%. In Rudayan, 21% of the population is under 6 years of age.

References

Cities and towns in Budaun district